Yarmouth is an unincorporated community in northwestern Des Moines County, Iowa, United States.

History
 The village was laid out by Andrew C Kline after arriving here in 1876 and opening a general store.  Around the same time, a blacksmith set up shop here.

In 1881, around the time the Burlington and Northwestern Railway arrived, the La Vega post office, originally about a mile to the east, was moved here and renamed Yarmouth.  By 1885, the village had close to 100 residents, and included 3 general stores, a drug store, blacksmith shop, billiard hall, and two churches.
 
In 1897, Yarmouth had a stock yard across the tracks from the depot, two grain elevators, and the Starker Brother's Lumber Yard and Corn Cribs.  The post office was across the street from a bank, and there was a Baptist and a Methodist Episcopal church, along with perhaps 20 houses.  Many of the vacant lots were owned by the Narrow Gauge Land Company.

In 1902, Yarmouth's population was 55. By 1905, There was a Masonic lodge, Federal Lodge No, 445, and the Mutual Telephone Company of Yarmouth was in business.

Geography
Yarmouth is located on a broad low ridge that has been identified as a terminal moraine of the Illinoian glaciation.  The land to the west is pre-illinoian, while the land to the east of this ridge is Illinoian glacial till.  Geological investigation of wells drilled in Yarmouth led to the discovery of a paleosol on top of the pre-illinoian surface and buried under the terminal moraine.  This has been named the Yarmouth paleosol, and the interglacial era during which this soil layer was built was formerly called the Yarmouth interglacial.

205th Avenue passes north–south through Yarmouth at an elevation of 810 feet above sea level; this forms part of Des Moines County Highway X31.

Demographics

References

External links
 University of Iowa Library Digital Collections
  Photo of Yarmouth depot in Aug. 1951.

Unincorporated communities in Iowa
Unincorporated communities in Des Moines County, Iowa